James Genus (born January 20, 1966) is an American jazz bassist. He plays both electric bass guitar and upright bass and currently plays in the Saturday Night Live Band. Genus has performed as a session musician and sideman throughout his career, having worked with an extensive list of artists.

Biography 

Genus was born in Hampton, Virginia. He began on guitar at age six and switched to bass at 13. He studied at Virginia Commonwealth University from 1983 to 1987 and played for a summer at Busch Gardens Williamsburg. Then he moved to New York City, where he quickly began working with many noted players on the city's jazz scene. He has played with Out of the Blue (1988–89), Horace Silver (1989), Roy Haynes and Don Pullen (1989–91), Nat Adderley (1990), Greg Osby and New York Voices (1990–91), Jon Faddis (1991), T.S. Monk (1991), Benny Golson (1991), Dave Kikoski (1991), Bob Berg (1991–96), Geoffrey Keezer (1992), Lee Konitz (1992), Michael Brecker (1992–96), Bob James (since 1994), Michel Camilo (since 1995), Elysian Fields (since 1995), Branford Marsalis (1996), Chick Corea (1996),  Didier Lockwood (1996), Dave Douglas (1996), Uri Caine (1997), Global Theory (1997), Ravi Coltrane (2000), Bill Evans (2005), Herbie Hancock (2008), and Daft Punk (2013).

Discography

As sideman
With Nat Adderley
The Old Country (Alfa, 1990)
With The Brecker Brothers
 Return of the Brecker Brothers (GRP, 1992)
 Out of the Loop (Brecker Brothers album) (GRP, 1994) - 37th Annual Grammy Awards Best Contemporary Jazz Performance
With Gary Burton
Generations (Concord, 2004)
With Uri Caine
Blue Wail (Winter & Winter, 1999)
The Sidewalks of New York: Tin Pan Alley (Winter & Winter, 1999)
The Goldberg Variations (Winter & Winter, 2000)
With James Carter
Present Tense (EmArcy, 2008)
With Dave Douglas
In Our Lifetime (New World, 1995)
Stargazer (Arabesque, 1997)
Moving Portrait (DIW, 1998)
Magic Triangle (Arabesque, 1998)
Soul on Soul (RCA, 2000)
Leap of Faith (Arabesque, 2000)
The Infinite (RCA, 2002)
Strange Liberation (Bluebird, 2003)
Meaning and Mystery (Greenleaf, 2006)
Live at the Jazz Standard (Greenleaf, 2007)
With Benny Golson
Domingo (Dreyfus, 1992)
With Alex Han
Spirit (3 Deuces, 2017)
With Lee Konitz
Jazz Nocturne (Venus/Evidence, 1992 [1994])
With Geoff Keezer
World Music (DIW, 1992)
With Pat Martino
Stone Blue (Blue Note, 1998)
With Steve Masakowski
What It Was (Blue Note, 1993)
With T. S. Monk
Take One (Blue Note, 1992)
With Don Pullen
Random Thoughts (Blue Note, 1990)
With Daft Punk
Random Access Memories (Columbia, 2013)
With James Williams
Up to The Minute Blues (DIW, 1994)

References
Mark Gilbert, "James Genus". Grove Jazz online.

External links
Conversation With James Genus, 4/01/2009

American jazz double-bassists
Male double-bassists
American jazz bass guitarists
Guitarists from Virginia
1966 births
Living people
Musicians from Hampton, Virginia
American male bass guitarists
20th-century American bass guitarists
Saturday Night Live Band members
Jazz musicians from Virginia
21st-century double-bassists
20th-century American male musicians
21st-century American male musicians
American male jazz musicians